Pulitzer, Inc. was an American media company who owned newspapers, television stations and radio stations across the United States. Founded by Joseph Pulitzer (who also funded the Pulitzer Prizes, which are not affiliated with the company), its papers included the St. Louis Post-Dispatch, the Arizona Daily Star (Tucson), and Chicago's Daily Southtown and Lerner Newspapers chain.

Ownership
Pulitzer Inc., which published 14 daily newspapers at the time, was sold to Lee Enterprises for $1.5 billion in 2005 (with both Gannett and the E. W. Scripps Company expressing interest in buying the company prior to Lee's acquisition). Pulitzer had previously acquired Scripps League's 16 daily and 30 non-daily publications in 1996.

In 1998, Pulitzer sold its broadcast group — nine television stations and five radio stations — to Hearst-Argyle.

Television stations owned (until 1998)
 (**) – Indicates that it was built and signed on by Pulitzer.

References

External links

Data
Yahoo! - Pulitzer Inc. Company Profile

Defunct newspaper companies of the United States
Defunct broadcasting companies of the United States
Mass media companies established in 1947
Mass media companies disestablished in 2005
1947 establishments in Missouri
Hearst Television
2005 disestablishments in Missouri
2005 mergers and acquisitions
Lee Enterprises publications